The 2015–16 All-Ireland Intermediate Club Football Championship was the 13th staging of the All-Ireland Intermediate Club Football Championship since its establishment by the Gaelic Athletic Association for the 2003–04 season.

The All-Ireland final was played on 6 February 2016 at Croke Park in Dublin, between St. Mary's and Hollymount Carramore. St. Mary's won the match by 2-10 to 0-10 to claim their first ever championship title.

References

2015 in Irish sport
2016 in Irish sport
All-Ireland Intermediate Club Football Championship
All-Ireland Intermediate Club Football Championship